Yuri Vladimirovich Matiyasevich, (born 2 March 1947 in Leningrad) is a Russian mathematician and computer scientist. He is best known for his negative solution of Hilbert's tenth problem (Matiyasevich's theorem), which was presented in his doctoral thesis at LOMI (the Leningrad Department of the Steklov Institute of Mathematics).

Biography

Early years and education 

Yuri Matiyasevich was born in Leningrad on March 2, 1947. The first few classes he studied at school No. 255 with Sofia G. Generson, thanks to whom he became interested in mathematics. In 1961 he began to participate in all-Russian olympiads. From 1962 to 1963 he studied at Leningrad physical and mathematical school No. 239. Also from 7th to 9th grade he was involved in the mathematical circle of the Leningrad Palace of Pioneers. In 1963-1964 he completed 10th grade at the MSU physics and mathematics boarding school No. 18 named after A. N. Kolmogorov.

In 1964, he won the International Mathematical Olympiad and was enrolled in the Mathematics and Mechanics Department of St. Petersburg State University without exams. He took his high school diploma exams as a first-year student.

Being a second year student, he released two papers in Mathematical logic that were published in the Proceedings of the USSR Academy of Sciences. He presented these works at the International Congress of Mathematicians in 1966.

After graduation, he enrolled in graduate school at St. Petersburg Department of Steklov Mathematical Institute of the Russian Academy of Sciences (POMI).

In 1972, at the age of 25, he defended his doctoral dissertation on the unsolvability of Hilbert's 10th problem.

From 1974 Matiyasevich worked in scientific positions at LOMI, first as a senior researcher, in 1980 he headed the Laboratory of Mathematical Logic. In 1995, Matiyasevich became a professor at POMI, initially at the chair of software engineering, later at the chair of algebra and number theory.

In 1997, he was elected as a corresponding member of Russian Academy of Sciences. Since 1998, Yuri Matiyasevich has been a vice-president of St. Petersburg Mathematical Society.
Since 2002, he has been a head of St.Petersburg City Mathematical Olympiad.

Since 2003, Matiyasevich has been a co-director of an annual German–Russian student school JASS.

In 2008, he was elected as a full member of Russian Academy of Sciences.

He was a member of the American Mathematical Society and the Association for Symbolic Logic; and also of the editorial boards for the journals Discrete Mathematics and Applications and Computer Instruments in Education. As a teacher, he mentored Eldar Musayev, Maxim Vsemirnov, Alexei Pastor, Dmitri Karpov

A polynomial related to the colorings of a triangulation of a sphere was named after Matiyasevich; see The Matiyasevich polynomial, four colour theorem and weight systems.

Awards and honors 

 1964: Gold medal at the International Mathematical Olympiad held in Moscow.
 1970:  "Young mathematician prize" of the Leningrad Mathematical Society.
 1980: Markov Prize of Academy of Sciences of the USSR.
 1996: Honorary Degree, Université d'Auvergne.
 1998: He received Humboldt Research Award.
 2003: Honorary Degree, Université Pierre et Marie Curie (UPMC).
 2007: Member of the Bavarian Academy of Sciences.

Selected works 

 At the age of 22, he came with a negative solution of Hilbert's tenth problem (Matiyasevich's theorem), which was presented in his doctoral thesis at LOMI (the Leningrad Department of the Steklov Institute of Mathematics).

 In Number theory, he answered George Pólya's question of 1927 regarding an infinite system of inequalities linking the Taylor coefficients of the Riemann -function. He proved that all these inequalities are a consequence of a single functional inequality linking the Fourier transform of a -function and its derivatives.

 In Graph theory, he found an unexpected connection between Four color theorem and divisibility of Binomial coefficients; gave a probabilistic interpretation of the four-color theorem.

 Discovered a number of new interesting qualities of the zeros of the Riemann zeta function.

Book 
Yuri Matiyasevich  Hilbert's 10th Problem, Foreword by Martin Davis and Hilary Putnam, The MIT Press, 1993. .

Papers 
 
 
 
 Yuri Matiyasevich, Proof Procedures as Bases for Metamathematical Proofs in Discrete Mathematics, Personal Journal of Yury Matiyasevich.
 Yuri Matiyasevich, Elimination of bounded universal quantifiers standing in front of a quantifier-free arithmetical formula, Personal Journal of Yuri Matiyasevich.
 Yuri Matiyasevich, A Polynomial related to Colourings of Triangulation of Sphere, Personal Journal of Yuri Matiyasevich.

See also
 Matiyasevich's theorem

References

Sources

External links

 Yuri Matiyasevich's home page.
 Yuri Matiyasevich at DBLP.
 
 Matiyasevich theorem on Scholarpedia.
 Vita and collaboration with France .
 
  Supercomputing for a Superproblem: A Computational Journey Into Pure Mathematics

1947 births
20th-century Russian mathematicians
21st-century Russian mathematicians
Saint Petersburg State University alumni
Living people
Full Members of the Russian Academy of Sciences
Mathematicians from Saint Petersburg
Russian computer scientists
Russian logicians
Soviet logicians
Soviet computer scientists
Soviet mathematicians
International Mathematical Olympiad participants
Academic staff of Saint Petersburg State University